Nicolás de Zaldívar y Zapata, O.S.A. (died 1646) was a Roman Catholic prelate who was appointed as Bishop of Nueva Caceres (1644–1646).

Biography
Nicolás de Zaldívar y Zapata was ordained a priest in the Order of Saint Augustine. On 2 May 1644, he was appointed during the papacy of Pope Urban VIII as Bishop of Nueva Caceres. He died before he was consecrated in 1646.

References

External links and additional sources
 (for Chronology of Bishops) 
 (for Chronology of Bishops) 

17th-century Roman Catholic bishops in the Philippines
Bishops appointed by Pope Urban VIII
1646 deaths
Augustinian bishops